Dunn Street may refer to:

 Dunn Street, Maidstone
 Dunn Street, Ashford